Serene  is an American classical concert pianist and technologist who created the Snowflake transport mechanism which was used heavily by Tor.

Early life and education 
Serene is ethnically Chinese and spent her childhood in a variety of regions within North America. As a pianist, she is largely self-taught; she also taught herself to write code at age 9. She attended Carnegie Mellon University, graduating with a degree in computer science in 2012.

Career in software 
She worked as a programmer for technology incubator Google Ideas, now Jigsaw LLC. While working at the International Computer Science Institute in Berkeley, California, she was a recipient of the Open Technology Fund’s Information Controls Fellowship, focusing on Snowflake, a pluggable transport enabling censorship circumvention for The Tor Project.

She is the founder of Snowstorm, an attempt to commercialize the Snowflake transport technology. Snowflake came to prominence when the Tor network began using it to prevent hostile actors from blocking access to Tor.

Career as a musician 

Serene has given performances at both concert halls and such non-traditional settings as San Francisco's Golden Gate Park and inside a decommissioned Boeing 747 at Burning Man. She received a composition credit on Kanye West’s opera Mary (2019).  She has released two EPs: Unraveling (2019), a collection of piano works by Maurice Ravel, and Rachmaninoff Concert No. 3 (2020). She experiences synesthesia and has written code to project abstract, moving visualizations behind her performances. She also has collaborated with Blue Man Group founder Chris Wink on music-technology projects and social-distanced events at Las Vegas's AREA15. As of 2021, SERENE is a Bösendorfer Artist, the sole non-conservatory pianist with such an affiliation. She has been invited to perform as a Grand Prize Virtuoso winner and at the San Francisco Botanical Garden's Flower Piano program.

References

External links 
Official website

American women classical pianists
American classical pianists
Living people
Carnegie Mellon University alumni